Armorique may refer to:

Armorica, an area of Brittany, France
, a number of ships with this name

See also